Jamie Joseph Harney (born 4 March 1996) is a Northern Irish professional footballer defender who last played for NIFL Premiership side Cliftonville.

After a two-year spell with Derry-based Maiden City Academy, Harney joined West Ham United. He continued his development with the club's Academy, featuring for the under-18 and under-21 sides. He joined Colchester United on a youth loan in November 2014, making his professional debut the same month. The deal was then made permanent in January 2015. He made five appearances before being released in September 2016. He joined Cliftonville in summer 2017.

Harney has represented Northern Ireland at youth level, receiving caps at under-16, under-17, under-19, under-20 and under-21 levels.

Club career

West Ham United
Born in Plumbridge, Northern Ireland, after spending time with Omagh United Youth, Harney joined the Maiden City Academy based in Derry in August 2010, where he spent two years prior to signing for English Premier League side West Ham United in July 2012 as a first-year scholar. In his first season with the club, he amassed 17 under-18 appearances and scored two goals. He also made his under-21 debut the same season, featuring as a substitute at Norwich City on 17 October 2012. He scored his first West Ham goal in an FA Youth Cup third round victory over Aldershot Town on 10 December 2012, powering a header into the back of the net to give the Hammers a 2–0 lead.

In the 2013–14 season, Harney made a further 16 appearances for the under-18 side, scoring once, and made eight under-21 appearances, starting each game.

Colchester United loan
After teaming up with Colchester United's Academy and appearing in their Essex Senior Cup penalty shoot-out defeat to Concord Rangers on 28 October 2014, Harney joined the League One club on a youth loan deal until 12 January 2015. However, on 13 November, Colchester manager Tony Humes confirmed that Harney had agreed to a one-and-a-half year permanent contract with the club.

Harney made his professional and Football League debut on 29 November 2014. He came on as a substitute for forward Rhys Healey in a tactical substitution following fellow loanee Will Packwood's red card for a foul in the penalty area. He arrived in the 72nd minute after Milton Keynes Dons had converted the penalty kick through Ben Reeves, when the score was 5–0. Ten-man Colchester eventually lost the game at Stadium mk 6–0. This was to be his only appearance of his loan spell.

Colchester United
On 28 January 2015, it was confirmed that Harney had joined Colchester United on a permanent basis, signing a one-and-a-half year contract to keep him at the Colchester Community Stadium until the summer of 2016. He made what was his second debut for the club on 20 February 2016 when he replaced Darren Ambrose after 35-minutes of Colchester's 5–2 defeat to Bury after fellow defender Tom Eastman was sent off for a second bookable offence.

Harney made his first start for the club on 5 March 2016 during Colchester's 2–0 defeat by Port Vale at Vale Park. After making four League One appearances during the season, Harney was offered a new contract at the end of the campaign. He signed a new one-year deal on 6 July 2016.

His contract was terminated by mutual consent on 9 September 2016 after failing to break into John McGreal's squad in the 2016–17 campaign.

Cliftonville
In May 2017 it was announced that, following a break from the game, Harney had signed for NIFL Premiership club Cliftonville on a free transfer.

International career
Harney has been capped by Northern Ireland at all age-group levels. He made five appearances and scored once at under-16 level. At under-17 level, he helped his side qualify for the elite round of the 2013 UEFA European Under-17 Championship, making eleven appearances in the age group. He captained the under-19 side to the 2014 Milk Cup Elite under-19 title after a 1–0 win over Canada on 1 August 2014. Harney made nine appearances at under-19 level for Northern Ireland, and two at under-20 level.

Harney was handed his under-21 debut by Jim Magilton on 9 September 2014 in their final 2015 UEFA European Under-21 Championship qualification match, in which they were defeated 4–1 at Shamrock Park.

Career statistics

Honours
Northern Ireland U19
2014 Milk Cup winner
Cliftonville
Irish League Cup: 2021-22

References

1996 births
Living people
People from County Tyrone
Association footballers from Northern Ireland
Association football defenders
Northern Ireland youth international footballers
Northern Ireland under-21 international footballers
West Ham United F.C. players
Colchester United F.C. players
Cliftonville F.C. players
English Football League players
NIFL Premiership players